James Francis Gordon Bynon (Baynham) (1925 - 2017) was a British linguist and Lecturer in Arabic and Berber at SOAS, London. He is known for his works on Berber languages and cultures.

Books
Recherches sur le Vocabulaire du Tissage en Afrique du Nord, 2005
James and Theodora Bynon (eds.), Hamito-Semitica, London 1975

References

1925 births
2017 deaths
Academics of SOAS University of London
Linguists from the United Kingdom
University of Paris alumni